Gurdeep Singh  is a Pakistani politician who is currently serving as a member of the Senate of Pakistan from the Khyber Pakhtunkhwa since March 2021. He belongs to Pakistan Tehreek-e-Insaf.

References

Living people
Year of birth missing (living people)
Pakistani Senators 2021–2027
Pakistan Tehreek-e-Insaf politicians